The 1941 Rice Owls football team was an American football team that represented Rice University as a member of the Southwest Conference (SWC) during the 1941 college football season. In its second season under head coach Jess Neely, the team compiled a 6–3–1 record (3–2–1 against SWC opponents) and was outscored by a total of 167 to 121. The team played its home games at Rice Field in Houston.

Guard Art Goforth was selected by the Associated Press as a first-team player on the 1941 All-Southwest Conference football team.

Schedule

References

Rice
Rice Owls football seasons
Rice Owls football